The 1979–80 Ice hockey Bundesliga season was the 22nd season of the Ice hockey Bundesliga, the top level of ice hockey in Germany. 12 teams participated in the league, and Mannheimer ERC won the championship.

First round

Second round

Group 1

Group 2

Group 3

Final round

Relegation

References

External links
Season on hockeyarchives.info

Eishockey-Bundesliga seasons
Ger
Bundesliga